The Busu River  is a river located near Wagang, Lae in Morobe Province of Papua New Guinea. It is the fastest-flowing river in Papua New Guinea and the sixth-fastest in the world.

References

Rivers of Papua New Guinea
Morobe Province
Lae